The Middle Fork of the Forked Deer River is formed in Henderson County, Tennessee. It is a small stream that flows through Carroll County, northern Madison County, Gibson County, Crockett County and Dyer County where it flows into the North Fork.

See also
List of rivers of Tennessee

References

Rivers of Tennessee
Bodies of water of Carroll County, Tennessee
Bodies of water of Madison County, Tennessee
Bodies of water of Gibson County, Tennessee
Rivers of Dyer County, Tennessee